Wolf Creek Bridge may refer to:

 Wolf Creek Bridge (Rocky Gap, Virginia), listed on the NRHP in Bland County, Virginia
 Wolf Creek Bridge (Dunbar, Nebraska), listed on the National Register of Historic Places (NRHP) in Otoe County, Nebraska